Edificio Corona is a Chilean telenovela created by Daniella Castagno and Rodrigo Bastidas for Mega. It aired from January 11, 2021 to August 9, 2021. It stars Francisco Melo, María Gracia Omegna, Nicolás Oyarzún, Fernando Godoy, and Mario Horton.

The telenovela takes place in an apartment building where a group of residents must do a rigorous quarantine after a neighbor is diagnosed with COVID-19.

Cast 
 Francisco Melo as Sergio Correa
 Paola Volpato as Ágata Cárdenas
 María Gracia Omegna as Javiera Sandoval Fernández
 Nicolás Oyarzún as Pablo Arancibia
 Fernando Godoy as Carlos González
 Mario Horton as Germán Manzano
 Vivianne Dietz as Rubí Cárdenas
 Hitzka Nudelman as Macarena Correa
 Josefina Fiebelkorn as Soledad Montané
 Dayana Amigo as Carolina Olmedo
 Pedro Campos as Julián Sánchez
 Paula Luchsinger as Catalina Manzano
 Magdalena Müller as Esmeralda Cárdenas
 Max Salgado as Miguel Sánchez
 María Elena Duvauchelle as Teresa "Telele" Fernández
 Simón Beltrán as Felipe "Pipe" Arancibia Montané
 Helen Mrugalski as Josefa Correa
 Matías Bielostotzky as Miguel Sánchez Miranda
 Claudio Arredondo as Renato Carrasco
 Jorge Arecheta as Tomás Jofré
 Gabriel Cañas as Benjamín
 Yamila Reyna as María Mercedes "La Meche"
 Jacqueline Boudon as Rosa Fuenzalida
 Mireya Sotoconil as Zulema Fuenzalida
 Diego Gabarró as Nicolás 
 Barbara Rios as Rocío
 Catalina de la Cerda as Petu
 Isidora Rebolledo as Paloma
 Josefina Velasco as Mireya
 Christian Zúñiga as César Sánchez
 Fernanda Finsterbusch as María José "Cote" Miranda
 Otilio Castro as Pastor Aurelio Cifuentes
 Roxana Naranjo as Elcira
 Felipe Zambrano as Nicanor Cifuentes
 Piamaría Silva as Nicole
 Daniela Castillo as Jacinta
 Paulina Hunt as Edith
 Hugo Vásquez as Tomás
 Elizabeth Torres as Marta Gutiérrez
 Daniel Morera as Cristián

Ratings

References

External links 
 

2021 telenovelas
2021 Chilean television series debuts
2021 Chilean television series endings
Chilean telenovelas
Mega (Chilean TV channel) telenovelas
Spanish-language telenovelas